Faisalabad is a city in Pakistan. It may also refer to:

Geography
Faisalabad District, a district of Punjab, Pakistan.
Faisalabad tehsil, a tehsil of the Faisalabad District.
Faisalabad Division, an administrative unit of Punjab, Pakistan.

Sports
 Faisalabad cricket team, a first-class domestic cricket team representing Faisalabad
 Faisalabad Wolves, a cricket team in the Faysal Bank T20 Cup

See also